Merophyas paraloxa is a species of moth of the  family Tortricidae. It is found in New Zealand, where it is found on the South Island.

The wingspan is 12–13 mm. The forewings are ochreous whitish, suffused with yellow ochreous and palest on the costa. The markings are yellow ochreous or ferruginous and are variably mixed with dark fuscous. The hindwings are dark grey.

References

	

Moths described in 1907
Archipini